Georgian inscriptions may refer to:
Bir el Qutt inscriptions
Bolnisi inscriptions
Ateni Theotokos Church inscription
Bedia Chalice inscription
Samshvilde Sioni inscription
Jvari inscriptions
Doliskana inscriptions
Davati stele